Jay Vaquer (born 6 February 1975) is a Brazilian singer and songwriter.

Biography
Vaquer was born in Rio de Janeiro, son of Jay Anthony Vaquer, an American guitarist, brother-in-law and former-partner of Raul Seixas, and a Brazilian singer Jane Duboc.

Career
At the age of 10 he recorded Jingles, and he learned to play guitar. He then became an actor in the Célia Helena Theatre, performing in the musical comedy Cazas de Cazuza in 2000.

After that Jay Vaquer achieved his first popular success in the same year with his first album "Nem Tão São" with the medium-size hit "A Miragem" ("The Mirage") and the second single "Aponta de um Iceberg". The songs only reached respectable positions on the MTV Brasil chart. But the radio stations seemed not to notice the success of the singles (probably a fault of his record label). This might have been the main reason why Jay's career did not launch then.

Four years later, in 2004, Vaquer released his second album "Vendo A Mim Mesmo", and he gained the attention of radio stations with the hit "Pode Agradecer" ("You May Thank Me"), which granted him brief fame. In 2005, Vaquer released his third album "Você Não Me Conhece" with the hit singles "Cotidiano de um Casal Feliz" and "A Falta que a Falta Faz".

Vaquer released his fourth album Formidável Mundo Cão in September 2007. On 5 July, he premiered the first single of this production "Longe Aqui", in his official Myspace.

Discography
 Nem Tão São (2000)
 Vendo A Mim Mesmo (2004) Release date 28 December
 Você Não Me Conhece (2005) Release date 1 November
 Formidável Mundo Cão (2007) Release date 1 September
 aLive in BraZil (CD e DVD) (2009) Release date 1 March
 Umbingobunker!? (2011) Release date 5 August
 Antes da Chuva Chegar - Transversões: Volume 1 (2013) Release date September
 Canções de Exílio - (2016) Release date 3 June
 La Guapa Payola - (2017) Release date 23 June
 Ecos do Acaso e Casos de Caos - (2018) Release date 18 May

1975 births
Living people
Musicians from Rio de Janeiro (city)
Brazilian people of American descent
Brazilian male singer-songwriters
21st-century Brazilian male singers
21st-century Brazilian singers
Brazilian pop guitarists
Brazilian male guitarists
21st-century guitarists